Fairley is a Scottish surname. Notable people with the name include:
 Barker Fairley (1887–1986), British-Canadian painter and writer
 Brian Fairley (b. 1959), former Scottish football manager
 Darlene Fairley (b. 1943), Washington State Senator
 Fiona Hamilton Fairley, English philanthropist
 Gordon Hamilton Fairley (1930–1975), Australian doctor
John Fairley, Lord Fairley, Scottish nobleman
 Ian Fairley (b. 1964), former Australian rules footballer
 Leonard Fairley (born 1951), American football player
 Margaret Fairley (1885–1968), Canadian writer
 Michelle Fairley, Northern Irish actress
 Sir Neil Hamilton Fairley (1891–1966), Australian soldier
 Nick Fairley (b. 1988), American football player
 Peter Fairley (1930–1998), British science journalist
 Sam Fairley (b. 1980), New Zealand cricketer

See also
 Fairlie (surname)
 Farley (name)